The list of ship commissionings in 1953 includes a chronological list of all ships commissioned in 1953.


See also 

1953
 Ship commissionings